Cedar Hills is a census-designated place and neighborhood in Washington County, Oregon, United States south of U.S. Route 26 and west of Oregon Route 217 and within the Portland metropolitan area. Constructed starting in 1946, Cedar Hills was the largest single housing tract development in the western United States at the time of its completion in 1961.

Cedar Hills is located almost entirely in unincorporated Washington County. In the early 2000s, a small portion of the neighborhood was annexed by the city of Beaverton, mainly comprising one school property and an adjacent community center, and in a plan agreed to by the county and Beaverton the remainder is scheduled for annexation in the future.

The formal Cedar Hills neighborhood currently includes 2,114 homes, whose owners are subject to the rules and covenants enforced by the area's homeowners' association, the Homes Association of Cedar Hills.

The population was 8,949 at the 2000 census.

History

Plans to build the large new neighborhood were announced by the project's developers in April 1946, and construction of the first 50 homes had begun by then. A writer for The Oregonian newspaper at the time called it "the most ambitious suburban housing development ever attempted in the Northwest". The planned neighborhood was consistent with the Racism in Oregon at the time, as the 1946 restrictions stated that "only Caucasians shall use or occupy the properties, except in the capacity of domestic servants, chauffeurs or employees."

Construction of the planned shopping center began in 1954.  Located immediately south of the Sunset Highway, at the northern end of the neighborhood, Cedar Hills Shopping Center opened in April 1955.  It originally included a Safeway supermarket (opened in August 1954, months earlier than the remainder of the center), a Rodgers five-and-dime, a Sears catalog store, and several other shops, along with a bank and a gas station.  The center's tall neon sign became a local landmark.  In 1979, TriMet opened a bus transit center on Wilshire Street, behind the shopping center.  Cedar Hills Transit Center remained in operation for almost 20 years, until replaced by the Sunset Transit Center – located immediately across the Sunset Highway (US 26) freeway from Cedar Hills Shopping Center – in 1998, with the opening of the Westside MAX line.  The Sunset TC's construction included a long pedestrian bridge over the freeway, to provide access between the TriMet bus and MAX station and the Cedar Hills neighborhood.  In 2009, the Oregon Department of Transportation opened a new Driver and Motor Vehicle Services Division (DMV) office in the Cedar Hills Shopping Center, serving as the DMV's Beaverton office, replacing one located on Allen Blvd. in Beaverton proper.

Geography

Demographics

As of the census of 2000, there were 8,949 people, 3,749 households, and 2,361 families residing in the neighborhood. The population density was 3,880.9 people per square mile (1,495.8/km2). There were 3,926 housing units at an average density of 1,702.6 per square mile (656.2/km2). The racial makeup of the CDP was 83.28% White, 1.32% African American, 0.57% Native American, 4.78% Asian, 0.35% Pacific Islander, 6.05% from other races, and 3.65% from two or more races. Hispanic or Latino of any race were 11.21% of the population.

There were 3,749 households, out of which 28.9% had children under the age of 18 living with them, 49.4% were married couples living together, 9.8% had a female householder with no husband present, and 37.0% were non-families. 29.0% of all households were made up of individuals, and 9.0% had someone living alone who was 65 years of age or older. The average household size was 2.39 and the average family size was 2.94.

In the neighborhood the population was spread out, with 23.0% under the age of 18, 7.7% from 18 to 24, 33.4% from 25 to 44, 23.4% from 45 to 64, and 12.5% who were 65 years of age or older. The median age was 36 years. For every 100 females, there were 98.4 males. For every 100 females age 18 and over, there were 96.8 males.

The median income for a household in the neighborhood was $48,200, and the median income for a family was $56,401. Males had a median income of $42,293 versus $29,922 for females. The per capita income for the CDP was $26,812. About 3.9% of families and 6.5% of the population were below the poverty line, including 7.8% of those under age 18 and 3.0% of those age 65 or over.

Public services

Schools
Cedar Hills is within the Beaverton School District. Cedar Park Middle School and Barnes Elementary School are the only public schools located within the Cedar Hills CDP, but the area's residents are also served by Sunset High School, Meadow Park Middle School, Ridgewood Elementary and William Walker Elementary.  At the high school  level, boundary changes approved in October 2016 and scheduled to take effect with the 2017–2018 school year will make Cedar Hills part of Beaverton High School's coverage area, in place of Sunset High School.

Previously, the area was also the site of Cedar Hills Elementary School, built in the early 1950s, at the intersection of SW Cedar Hills Blvd. and SW Park Way.  That school closed in 1983, due to declining student enrollment districtwide at the time, and the building was leased to, and subsequently sold to, the Tualatin Hills Park & Recreation District, which repurposed it as the Cedar Hills Recreation Center.

Other services

Fire protection and emergency medical services are provided through Tualatin Valley Fire and Rescue.

Cedar Hills is served by the Tualatin Hills Park & Recreation District (THPRD), which maintains several parks in the area –  including the  Commonwealth Lake Park. THPRD also operates the Cedar Hills Recreation Center, a community center (not limited to Cedar Hills residents) located in a former elementary school.

See also
 Bernard's Airport
 Cedar Hills Crossing – shopping center located on Cedar Hills Blvd., just south of Cedar Hills
 Cedar Mill – nearby area, with a similar name

References

External links

1946 establishments in Oregon
Census-designated places in Oregon
Census-designated places in Washington County, Oregon
Portland metropolitan area
Unincorporated communities in Oregon
Unincorporated communities in Washington County, Oregon